Klæbu is a former municipality in Trøndelag county, Norway. It existed from 1838 until its dissolution in 2020 when it was incorporated into the neighboring Trondheim Municipality. The administrative center was the village of Klæbu. The other major village in Klæbu municipality was Tanem.

Even though agriculture has traditionally been the main industry for Klæbu, the municipality most recently functioned more as a commuter town of Trondheim, where many of Klæbu's inhabitants work or attend school.

At the time of its dissolution in 2020, the  municipality is the 337th largest by area out of the 422 municipalities in Norway. Klæbu is the 171st most populous municipality in Norway with a population of 6,094.

General information

The municipality of Klæbu was established on 1 January 1838 (see formannskapsdistrikt).  On 1 January 1899, the small northwestern part of Klæbu (population: 533) was separated from Klæbu to form the new municipality of Tiller.

On 1 January 2018, the municipality switched from the old Sør-Trøndelag county to the new Trøndelag county.

On 1 January 2020, the municipality of Klæbu merged with the municipality of Trondheim to the north.

Name
The municipality (originally the parish) is named after the old Klæbu farm since the first Klæbu Church was built there. The district/parish has a lot of small rocky hills.

Coat of arms
The coat of arms was granted on 8 July 1983 and it was in use until 1 January 2020 when the municipality was dissolved. The official blazon is "Argent, flaunches azure". This means the arms have a field (background) that has a tincture of argent which means it is commonly colored white, but if it is made out of metal, then silver is used. Each side of the arms have blue flaunches. The river has been of great importance for the local development, for agriculture and hydroelectricity generation, hence the use of the waterfall as a typical symbol for the municipality. The waterfall is no longer visible as that part of the river became part of Bjørsjøen lake after the building of the dam at Hyttfossen. The arms were designed by Einar H. Skjervold.

Churches
The Church of Norway had one parish within the municipality of Klæbu. It is part of the Heimdal prosti (deanery) in the Diocese of Nidaros.

Geography
The Nidelva river, which runs through the area of Klæbu, is a large source of hydroelectric power with a total of 3 power stations within the municipality borders.  The river runs north from the lake Selbusjøen.  The mountain Vassfjellet is located along the western border with Melhus.

The landlocked municipality of Klæbu has three municipalities that border it: Melhus is located to the west and south, Selbu is located to the east, and Trondheim is to the north.

Media
The newspaper KlæbuPosten is published in Klæbu.

Government
All municipalities in Norway, including Klæbu, are responsible for primary education (through 10th grade), outpatient health services, senior citizen services, unemployment and other social services, zoning, economic development, and municipal roads.  The municipality is governed by a municipal council of elected representatives, which in turn elect a mayor.  The municipality falls under the Trøndelag District Court and the Frostating Court of Appeal.

Municipal council
The municipal council of Klæbu is made up of 23 representatives that are elected to four year terms.  The party breakdown of the final municipal council was as follows:

Mayors
The mayors of Klæbu:

1838–1839: Hans Jørgen Darre 	
1840–1851: Lars Larsen Forseth, Sr.	
1852–1855: Eskild Lysklæth 	
1856–1863: Nicolai Ulstad  	
1864–1867: Eskild Lysklæth 	
1868–1879: Lars Larsen Forseth, Jr. (V)
1880–1881: Sivert Thonstad (H)
1882–1887: Ludvig Lysklæth 	
1888–1892: Hannibal Hartmann  	
1892–1893: Andreas Nideng (H)
1894–1895: Sivert Thonstad (H)
1896–1904: Ole Aune (V)
1905–1913: Paul O. Lium (V)
1914–1916: Karl Ulstad (V)
1917–1919: Ole Halseth (Ap)
1920–1928: Paul O. Lium (Bp)
1929–1931: Ole Halseth (Ap)
1932–1934: John E. Nervik (Ap)
1935–1937: Bernt Forset (Bp)
1938–1941: John E. Nervik (Ap)
1941–1945: Torbjørn Lium (NS)
1945-1945: Bernt Forset (Bp)
1945-1945: John E. Nervik (Ap)
1946–1957: Johan Nervik (Ap)
1958–1959: Lars Bendiksvoll (Ap)
1960–1963: Sigurd Gjølgali (Ap)
1964–1967: Lars Bendiksvoll (Ap)
1968–1979: Reidar Fosshode (Ap)
1980–1983: Arild Huitfeldt (H)
1984–1987: Ivar Myhre (Ap)
1988–1989: Kai Nordseth (Ap)
1990–1991: Sverre Tangen (Ap)
1992–2007: Ivar Skei (SV)
2007–2015: Jarle Martin Gundersen (Sp)
2015–2019: Kirsti Tømmervold (Ap)

References

External links

Municipal fact sheet from Statistics Norway 
Klæbu church 

 
Trondheim
Former municipalities of Norway
1838 establishments in Norway
2020 disestablishments in Norway
Populated places disestablished in 2020